

Player of the year

Wake Forest senior center Dickie Hemric

ACC tournament

See 1955 ACC men's basketball tournament

NCAA tournament

Round of 24

Villanova 74
Duke 73

NIT

League rules prevented ACC teams from playing in the NIT, 1954–1966